John Lumpkin (March 13, 1892 – January 21, 1972) was an American college football coach and politician. He was the head football coach at Mississippi State Teachers College—now known as University of Southern Mississippi—in Hattiesburg, Mississippi for one season, in 1930, compiling a record of 3–5–1. Lunpkin served in the Mississippi House of Representatives from 1928 to 1932 and the Mississippi State Senate from 1932 to 1936.

Lumpkin was born on March 13, 1892, Carriere, Mississippi and was a native of Poplarville, Mississippi. He attended the University of Mississippi, lettering for the Ole Miss Rebels football team in 1916 as a guard. He was elected team captain for the 1917 season, but left the school to serve in World War I.

Lumpkin died on January 21, 1972, at Methodist Hospital in Hattiesburg.

Head coaching record

References

1892 births
1972 deaths
20th-century American politicians
Ole Miss Rebels football players
Southern Miss Golden Eagles football coaches
Members of the Mississippi House of Representatives
Mississippi state senators
American military personnel of World War I
People from Poplarville, Mississippi
Coaches of American football from Mississippi
Players of American football from Mississippi